DC Super Hero Girls: Super Hero High (also known as Super Hero High in United States) is a 2016  American animated superhero television film based on the DC Super Hero Girls franchise. Albeit explaining the origins of Supergirl/Kara Zor-El and Batgirl/Barbara Gordon and taking place after the first season, it was created to promote the new DC Super Hero Girls franchise and aired on Boomerang on March 19, 2016 in the United States as well as on Boomerang UK on May 21, 2016 in the United Kingdom and Ireland. Also, Cartoon Network aired this show again on April 30, 2016 and June 5, 2016 in the US and has subsequently made it available on its website.

Synopsis
School is in session for DC Super Hero Girls! This is where students master their super powers, brain power, and will power to become the Super Heroes of tomorrow. When Supergirl crash lands into the cafeteria, it is evident that though she has incredible power, she has a long way to go before she becomes a Super Hero. As Supergirl learns to harness her powers, the Junior Detective Club investigates a mysterious rash of security breaches. Could it all be because of reformed Super-Villain and Super Hero High Vice-Principal Gorilla Grodd - or something far worse?

(The events in this TV special are also depicted in the Supergirl at Super Hero High novel by Lisa Yee.)

Cast

 Anais Fairweather as Supergirl
 Grey Griffin as Wonder Woman / Giganta / Korugarian
 Tara Strong as Poison Ivy / Harley Quinn
 Mae Whitman as Batgirl / Speed Queen 
 Teala Dunn as Bumblebee / Artemiz
 Stephanie Sheh as Katana
 Ashley Eckstein as Cheetah
 Nika Futterman as Hawkgirl
 Josh Keaton as Hal Jordan / Barry Allen/Flash
 Tania Gunadi as Lady Shiva
 Fred Tatasciore as Killer Croc / Perry the Parademon
 April Stewart as Granny Goodness / Stompa
 Misty Lee as Big Barda / Mad Harriet
 Helen Slater as Martha Kent
 Tom Kenny as Commissioner Gordon
 Hynden Walch as Starfire

References

External links

American television films
2010s American animated films
2010s animated superhero films
2010s English-language films
2010s high school films
2010s superhero comedy films
Warner Bros. Animation animated films
2016 television specials
2016 television films
2016 films
Films based on Mattel toys
American children's animated adventure films
American children's animated comedy films
American children's animated fantasy films
American children's animated superhero films
American fantasy adventure films
American high school films
DC Super Hero Girls films